was a town in the former Tome District, Miyagi Prefecture, Japan. It is now a part of the city of Tome.

As of November 2005, the town had an estimated population of 7,194 people and a population density of 219.00 persons per km². The total area was 32.85 km² (apx. 13 mi².).

On April 1, 2005, Toyosato, along with the towns of Hasama, Ishikoshi, Minamikata, Nakada, Toyoma, Towa and Yoneyama (all from Tome District) were merged with the town of Tsuyama (from Motoyoshi District) to create the city of Tome.

Transportation

Train stations
 Kesennuma Line: Rikuzen-Toyosato - Mitakedō

Major roads
 Sanriku Expressway (Monou-Toyosato interchange)
 Route 346

Dissolved municipalities of Miyagi Prefecture
Tome, Miyagi